Brian Kelly (born October 6, 1974) is an American former professional soccer player who played as a midfielder. Kelly spent five seasons in Major League Soccer.  He also played at both the 1991 FIFA U-17 World Championship and 1993 FIFA World Youth Championship.

Soccer

Club  career
Kelly, after starring at Lake Lehman High School in Northeastern Pennsylvania, attended Duke University, playing on the men's soccer team from 1993 to 1996.  In February 1997, the New York/New Jersey MetroStars selected Kelly in the first round (fifth overall) in the 1997 MLS College Draft.  He remained with the MetroStars until the 2000 season.  That year, he played seven games in New Jersey before being traded to the Los Angeles Galaxy in exchange for Roy Myers.  He played eleven games with the Galaxy, began the 2001 season with the Galaxy before finishing it with the Tampa Bay Mutiny.  Before moving to Tampa Bay, the Galaxy sent Kelly on loan to the Portland Timbers where he scored the first goal in that team's history when he hit in a rebounded shot from Mark Baena in a 2-1 loss to the El Paso Patriots.  He left MLS at the end of the season.

National team
In 1991, Kelly was a member of the U.S. U-17 national team at the 1991 FIFA U-17 World Championship.  Two years later, he played at the 1993 FIFA World Youth Championship for the U.S. U-20 national team.

Banking
After retiring from soccer, Kelly entered banking.  In January 2002, he was hired by Goldman Sachs.  He is currently a director in MBS sales at BNP Paribas working under Michael Walker.

References

External links
 MetroStars Player Profile
 

1974 births
Living people
American soccer players
Parade High School All-Americans (boys' soccer)
Duke Blue Devils men's soccer players
New York Red Bulls players
LA Galaxy players
Major League Soccer players
Portland Timbers (2001–2010) players
Tampa Bay Mutiny players
A-League (1995–2004) players
United States men's youth international soccer players
United States men's under-20 international soccer players
Soccer players from California
New York Red Bulls draft picks
Association football midfielders